Sylvia Legris (born 1960) is a Canadian poet. Originally from Winnipeg, Manitoba, she now lives in Saskatoon, Saskatchewan. She has published four volumes of poetry, the third of which, Nerve Squall, won the 2006 Griffin Poetry Prize and Pat Lowther Award, and the fourth of which was published by New Directions.

Legris has also twice been nominated for a Pushcart Prize. She has been nominated for Best of the Small Presses Series, and in 2001 won The Malahat Review'''s Long Poem Prize for Fishblood Sky. Legris also received an Honourable Mention in the poetry category of the 2004 National Magazine Awards.

Legris served as Editor at Grain from 2008-2011.

 Bibliography 

Collectionsash petals (chapbook 1996)Circuitry of Veins (Turnstone Press 1996)Iridium Seeds (Turnstone Press 1998)Nerve Squall (Coach House Press 2005) - winner of 2006 Pat Lowther Award and the 2006 Canadian Griffin Poetry Prize; shortlisted for the Saskatchewan Book AwardPneumatic Antiphonal (New Directions 2013)The Hideous Hidden (New Directions 2016)Garden Physic'' (New Directions 2021)

Poems

External links
 Griffin Poetry Prize biography, including audio clip
 Globe and Mail interview - A Poet's Winning Season, by Patricia Robertson
 The Danforth Review - review of Nerve Squall
 RCI's Spotlight (CBC) interview with Sylvia Legris
 Sylvia Legris appointed editor of Grain magazine

1960 births
Living people
Writers from Winnipeg
20th-century Canadian poets
Canadian women poets
21st-century Canadian poets
Canadian magazine editors
The New Yorker people
Women magazine editors
20th-century Canadian women writers
21st-century Canadian women writers